The Ormonde Wind Farm is a wind farm west of Barrow-in-Furness in the Irish Sea. It has a total capacity of 150 MW and is expected to produce around 500 GWh of electricity per year.

Planning
Originally the Ormonde project was planned as a hybrid wind and natural gas powered electricity generation plant supplied from the Ormonde South and Ormonde North gas fields. The project was developed by Eclipse Energy. In 2008, Vattenfall bought Eclipse Energy and the project was developed as wind energy only. The project management company throughout the project has been Offshore Design Engineering.

Construction

Construction started in 2010 and was completed in August 2011.  Prysmian provided submarine power cable connections including 27 km of 33 kV inter-array cables to connect the wind turbines and a 42 km of 132 kV export cable to connect the wind farm to the substation.
30 turbines each with 5 MW nameplate capacity are provided by REpower and electrical works were to be carried out by Areva.  Steel foundations for generators were developed and designed by OWEC Tower and produced by Burntisland Fabrications. Logistics and assembly services are provided by Harland and Wolff. Generators were installed by A2SEA. The first four steel foundations were delivered in July 2010, and were installed by a joint venture of Scaldis and Geosea BV.

The wind farm was commissioned on 22 February 2012 and is now fully operational.

Its levelised cost has been estimated at £149/MWh.

Incident 
In 2021, a rotor and blades from a wind turbine fell into the sea following a maintenance error. The components broke up and debris has been washed up on nearby beaches.

See also

 Barrow Offshore Wind Farm
 List of tallest buildings and structures in Barrow-in-Furness
 Wind power in the United Kingdom

References

External links

 Ormonde Wind Farm (Vattenfall's website)
 LORC Knowledge - Datasheet for Ormonde Wind Farm
 Ormonde Wind Farm - Jacket Installation 
 BBC - Three steps to build a wind farm
Foundocean Project references 

Offshore wind farms in the Irish Sea
Wind farms in England
Vattenfall wind farms
Buildings and structures in Barrow-in-Furness
Energy infrastructure completed in 2012
2012 establishments in England